Richard Tamble (born July 26, 1945) is an American wrestler. He competed in the men's Greco-Roman 52 kg at the 1968 Summer Olympics.

References

1945 births
Living people
American male sport wrestlers
Olympic wrestlers of the United States
Wrestlers at the 1968 Summer Olympics
Sportspeople from Inglewood, California